Pitton may refer to:

People

 Bruno Pittón (born 1993), Argentine professional footballer
 Joseph Pitton de Tournefort (1656–1708), French botanist
 Mauro Pittón (born 1994), Argentine professional footballer 
 Scholastique Pitton (1621–1689), French writer and historian

Places

 Pitton, a village in Wiltshire, England
 Pitton, Swansea, village in the Gower Peninsula, Wales

Other

 Pitton (sport), combination of pickleball and badminton